Peshawar attack may refer to:

1994 Peshawar school bus hijacking
1995 Peshawar bombing
2007 Peshawar hotel bombing
2008 Peshawar bombings
Pearl Continental hotel bombing
9 October 2009 Peshawar bombing
28 October 2009 Peshawar bombing
2009 Peshawar judicial complex bombing
5 April 2010 North-West Frontier Province attacks 
19 April 2010 Peshawar bombing
March 2011 Peshawar bombing
May 2011 Peshawar bombing
June 2011 Peshawar bombings
2012 Bacha Khan International Airport attack
2013 Peshawar mosque attack
June 2013 Pakistan bombings
Peshawar church bombing
Qissa Khwani Bazaar bombing
2014 Peshawar cinema bombings
2014 Peshawar school massacre
2015 Peshawar mosque attack
2015 Camp Badaber attack
2016 Peshawar bus bombing
2017 Hayatabad suicide bombing
May 2017 Peshawar bombings
2017 Peshawar police vehicle attack
2017 Peshawar Agriculture Directorate attack
2018 Peshawar suicide bombing
2020 Peshawar school bombing
2022 Peshawar mosque attack
Sarband police station attack
2023 Peshawar mosque bombing